Madhurya Barua (born 22 April 1942) is an Indian former cricketer. He played first-class cricket for Assam and Bengal.

See also
 List of Bengal cricketers

References

External links
 

1942 births
Living people
Indian cricketers
Assam cricketers
Bengal cricketers
People from Jorhat district
Cricketers from Assam